Michael Thomas van der Veen (born September 16, 1963) is an American attorney who specializes in personal injury law. He represented former president Donald Trump during his second impeachment trial in the United States Senate, which resulted in acquittal on February 13, 2021.

Early life and education 
Van der Veen was born September 16, 1963 in Norwich, Connecticut. He attended Choate Rosemary Hall in Connecticut, graduating in 1981. He next attended Ohio Wesleyan University and graduated in 1985. He attended law school at Quinnipiac University School of Law, receiving a Juris Doctor degree in 1988. He also received an LLM degree in trial advocacy from Temple University School of Law.

Career

Overview 
Van der Veen has been an attorney since 1988. He is a founder of the Philadelphia criminal and personal injury law firm, van der Veen, Hartshorn, and Levin. His litigation practice includes criminal and personal injury litigation. He has represented clients in connection with motor vehicle accidents, construction accidents, dog bites, product defects, and police brutality. He has represented criminal defendants accused of rape, drunk driving, drug trafficking, embezzlement, and murder.

In August 2020, van der Veen represented a client suing President Donald Trump, alleging that Trump's attacks on the U.S. Postal Service were unsupported by evidence. The suit alleged: "These actions... arise in an environment subject to repeated claims by President Donald J. Trump that voting by mail is ripe with fraud, despite having no evidence in support of these claims . . ."

Trump impeachment trial 

On February 12 and 13, 2021, van der Veen presented arguments for the defense of Donald Trump at the former president's second impeachment trial. On February 13, 2021, the Senate reacted with gasps and laughter when van der Veen stated he would seek to depose at least 100 people for the trial at his Philadelphia office, including Nancy Pelosi and Vice President Kamala Harris, mispronouncing the name "Philadelphia." He responded, "I don’t know how many civil lawyers are here, but that’s the way it works folks. I don’t know why you’re laughing. It is civil process. That is the way lawyers do it."

At the conclusion of the trial, the Senate voted 57-43 to convict Donald Trump of inciting insurrection in the January 6, 2021 attack on the U.S. Capitol. Trump was acquitted because the U.S. Constitution requires that two-thirds of the Senate must vote for conviction. Seven Republican senators voted to convict Donald Trump, the largest bipartisan vote for an impeachment conviction of a U.S. president.

Following the Senate trial, van der Veen angrily argued with CBS News anchor Lana Zak, after she disagreed that evidence was doctored against Trump, and he ended the interview by ripping off his microphone.

Van der Veen was played by Pete Davidson in the cold open of Saturday Night Live on February 13, 2021. Davidson satirized van der Veen's use of the term "Jiminy Cricket" and his pronunciation of Philadelphia. His home in suburban Philadelphia was vandalized with graffiti and a small group of protesters picketed outside his law office in Philadelphia.

References 

1963 births
Living people
People from Norwich, Connecticut
Choate Rosemary Hall alumni
Illinois lawyers
New Jersey lawyers
Ohio Wesleyan University alumni
Quinnipiac University alumni
Pennsylvania lawyers
Members of the defense counsel for the second impeachment trial of Donald Trump
Temple University Beasley School of Law alumni
American people of Dutch descent